Trim was a constituency and rotten borough in Trim, County Meath, represented in the Irish House of Commons until 1800.

Members of Parliament 
1560 John Parker and Patrick Martell
1585 Moses Hamon and Thomas Gwyre
1613–1615 Sir Thomas Ashe and Roger Jones
1634–1635 Robert, Lord Dillon and Valerian Weasley
1639–1649 Robert, Lord Dillon (elevated to the peerage and replaced by James Whyte. Whyte died and was replaced 1643 by Thomas Trafford) and Patrick Barnewall of Kilbrew (expelled and replaced 1642 by George Peasley. Peasley died and was replaced 1642 by Thomas Coote)
1661–1666 Sir Thomas Gifford, 1st Baronet (died and replaced 1662 by Henry Whitfield) and Alexander Jephson (Jephson executed July 1663. Replaced 1663 by Arthur Dillon)

1689–1801

Notes

References 
 
 

1800 disestablishments in Ireland
Constituencies disestablished in 1800
Constituencies of the Parliament of Ireland (pre-1801)
Historic constituencies in County Meath